The Vietnam Friendship Medal is a title of honor awarded by the Government of Vietnam to foreigners who have worked in Vietnam for a certain period, and made contributions to the cause of the construction and defense of Vietnam.

Design 
Decree No. 50/2006/ND-CP dated May 19, 2006 stipulates the specifications of the Friendship Medal as follows:Article 19. “Friendship Medal”"Red flag woven pentagonal Rayon silk medal band with two gold lines, 3 micron thick Nico-alloy plated red copper; Dimensions 38mm x 27mm x 40mm."

The medal body is a yellow circle with a diameter of 37mm, inside is a stylized five-pointed gold star, in the middle are two hands shaking hands on the shape of a globe, above are the words "Friendship Medal" (red), below is the word "Vietnam" (yellow) placed on the historical wheel and two branches on both sides, material of 3 micron thick Nico-alloy gold-plated red copper.

The obverse features the National Emblem of the Socialist Republic of Vietnam surrounding the Flag of Vietnam.

References 

Vietnamese awards
Orders, decorations, and medals of Vietnam
Hero (title)
Awards established in 2003